Haljala is a small borough in Lääne-Viru County, in northern Estonia. It's located about 10 km northwest of the town of Rakvere, by the Tallinn–Narva (Tallinn–Saint Petersburg) road (part of E20). Haljala is the administrative centre of Haljala Parish. As of 2011 Census, the settlement's population was 1,084.

Haljala was first mentioned in 1241.

One of the main sights in Haljala is Haljala church. It was initially built on an important crossing of Tallinn–Narva road with a road from Rakvere to the northern coast, particularly to the Toolse harbour. The first church was wooden and was built in the 13th century. The present stone church was built in the end of 14th century.

Notable people
Herbert Johanson (1884–1964), architect
Gerli Padar (born 1979), singer
Tanel Padar (born 1980), singer
Rain Veideman (born 1991), basketball player
Kadri Voorand, singer
Peeter Tooming, photographer
Jaan Tooming, writer

References

External links
Haljala Parish 

Boroughs and small boroughs in Estonia
Kreis Wierland